Lonely Mine is a village in Matabeleland North, Zimbabwe and is located about  north-east of Bulawayo, just north of Inyati. It was established in 1906 when gold was discovered in the area. Gold, nickel and tungsten are still mined in the area today.

References 

Populated places in Matabeleland North Province